The Ocean Expo Golf Tournament was a men's professional golf tournament that was held at Okinawa International Golf Club in Onna, Okinawa, Japan in 1975.

Winners

References

Defunct golf tournaments in Japan
Sports competitions in Okinawa Prefecture
Recurring sporting events established in 1975
Recurring sporting events disestablished in 1975
1975 in golf
1975 in Japanese sport